Loja, formerly Loxa, is a town in southern Spain, situated at the western limit of the province of Granada. It is surrounded by the so-called Sierra de Loja, of which the highest peak, Sierra Gorda, stands 1,671 metres above sea-level.

Loja has sometimes been identified with the ancient Ilipula, or with the Lacibi (Lacibis) of Pliny and Ptolemy. It is unknown when Loja was first captured by the Moors; most likely this happened in the 8th century. It first clearly emerges in the Arab chronicles of the year 890. It was taken by Ferdinand III in 1226, but was soon afterwards abandoned. Its Moorish name, Medina Lawša, was changed to Lauxa when it was captured by the Christians in 1486, during the Reconquista. Isabella I of Castile called it the "flower among thorns".

The town was the centre of the Loja uprising in 1861, led by local , that was quickly suppressed.

Main sights
The town's Islamic heritage is still evident in the quarter of the Alcazaba, a Moorish fortress of which most of the walls and towers remain.

Other sights include:
 Convent of Santa Clara (16th century)
 Convento of St. Francis of Assisi, including a 16th-century cloister
Church of the Incarnation (16th-17th centuries)
Church of San Gabriel (16th century)
Church of Santa Catalina (16th-17th century)
Church of N.tra S.ra Virgen de la Caridad  (16th century)
Hermitages of Jesus Nazareno, san Roque, and Calvario, 16th century chapels and sanctuaries
 Caseron de los Alcaides Cristianos (17th century)
 Palacio de Narvaez (17th century)
Fuente de la Mora ("Fountain of the Moorish maiden"), also known as los venticinco canos, a fountain where waters from different springs are made to flow from twenty-five tubes.

Notes

References
Days in the Sun by Martin Andersen Nexo (1929)

Municipalities in the Province of Granada